The lesser wagtail-tyrant (Stigmatura napensis) is a small South American species of bird in the Tyrannidae family.

The lesser wagtail-tyrant is found on river islands along the Amazon River..

The lesser wagtail-tyrant (Lesser) is now typically found in early succession vegetation. This habitat consists of vigorously growing grasses, shrubs, and trees. Another habitat these birds are found in is newly forming beaches with thick tessaria, tall grass, and young trees on islands along large white-water rivers.

The lesser wagtail-tyrant are medium-sized birds with grey upperparts and yellow underparts. They have a long white and brown tail and a mixture of white and dusky feathered wings. The birds have a narrow pale-yellow colored eyebrow and a blackish eyeline. Their beak is short and black, like its short, dark legs.

The lesser wagtail-tyrant is known to search for their typical diet of insects in pairs or family groups. The birds forage very actively for insects, often cocking the tail well above the horizontal, and in the caatinga sometimes descending onto the ground. The bird hunts with active moves with short pauses. Their tail is usually cocked horizontally above them and fanned so that they are exposing their broad white tips and yellowish base while their wings are slightly drooped. While the diet of the Bahia group is virtually unknown, it is assumed to be largely or entirely insectivorous and they typically descend to the ground to feed.

The lesser wagtail-tyrant has a rapidly delivered song, often given in duet, which easily betrays the species’ presence. The Lesser group's call is noted to have a soft whistled “wheeert?” or “weeeéé” and a harsh descending rattle that sounds similar to the sound of a bouncing ball. The Bahia group's call is very similar to the Lesser's call except for the descending rattle part of the duet is accelerating with long initial notes. The song is a lively asynchronous duet, one bird uttering a descending rattle, the other uttering several more melodious notes.

References

Stigmatura
Birds of the Amazon Basin
Birds described in 1926
Taxonomy articles created by Polbot